Chosen Survivors is a 1974 Mexican-American horror science fiction film directed by Sutton Roley and starring Jackie Cooper, Alex Cord, Richard Jaeckel, Bradford Dillman, Pedro Armendáriz Jr. and Diana Muldaur

Plot
After being selected at random by a computer to seek safety in an underground bomb shelter on the eve of a nuclear attack, a group of refugees makes a horrible realization: They are sharing the space with a colony of vampire bats. And since going back above ground is not an option, they are forced to stay and fight for their lives.

Cast
 Jackie Cooper as Raymond Couzins 
 Alex Cord as Steven Mayes 
 Richard Jaeckel as Major Gordon Ellis 
 Bradford Dillman as Peter Macomber  
 Pedro Armendáriz, Jr. as Luis Cabral (as Pedro Armendariz Jr.)
 Diana Muldaur as Alana Fitzgerald  
 Lincoln Kilpatrick as Woody Russo 
 Gwenn Mitchell as Carrie Draper 
 Barbara Babcock as Dr. Lenore Chrisman
 Cristina Moreno as Kristin Lerner (as Christina Moteno)
 Nancy Rodman as Claire Farraday
 Kelly Lange as Mary Louise Borden

Releases
The film was released theatrically in the United States on May 24, 1974.  The original distributor was Columbia Pictures.

The film was released on DVD in a double feature with The Earth Dies Screaming as part of MGM's Midnite Movies series.

Most recently, film restoration company Kino Lorber released blu-ray collectors edition on October 16, 2016.

See also
 List of American films of 1974
 Midnite Movies

References

External links
 
 
 

1974 films
1974 horror films
American science fiction horror films
Mexican science fiction horror films
English-language Mexican films
1970s science fiction horror films
Apocalyptic films
Columbia Pictures films
Films scored by Fred Karlin
Metromedia Producers Corporation films
Films directed by Sutton Roley
1970s English-language films
1970s American films
1970s Mexican films